Lyn Gunson (born 31 December 1953), also known as Lyn Parker, is a former New Zealand netball international and a former head coach of both the New Zealand and England national netball teams. She captained New Zealand when they won the 1985 World Games title and coached them when they retained the same title in 1989. In 1989 she was named New Zealand Coach of the Year. Between 1999 and 2008 Gunson also served as head coach and/or director of netball for Team Bath, guiding them to Netball Superleague titles in 2005–06 and 2006–07.

Early life and education
Gunson is originally from Northland, New Zealand. In 1974 she graduated from the University of Otago with a Diploma in Physical Education. She also gained a Masters in Business Administration from the University of Waikato. Between 1995 and 1999 she also worked as a lecturer at Waikato. She has also worked as a secondary teacher and as director of the Waikato Institute for Leisure and Sport.

Playing career

New Zealand
Between 1974 and 1985 Gunson made 70 senior appearances for New Zealand. She made her senior debut on 15 October 1974 against Singapore. She first captained New Zealand in 1974 during a tour of England while still aged 21. She became the permanent captain in 1978 at the age of 24. She subsequently captained New Zealand at the 1979 World Netball Championships, when New Zealand shared the title with Australia and Trinidad and Tobago, and at the 1983 World Netball Championships when New Zealand finished as runners-up to Australia. She continued to captain New Zealand until she retired as a player. She made her final appearance for New Zealand in the 1985 World Games final as New Zealand defeated Australia 39–37 to win the inaugural title. Her teammates while playing for New Zealand included, among others, Rita Fatialofa, Margaret Forsyth, Yvonne Willering and Waimarama Taumaunu.

Coaching career

New Zealand
Between 1989 and 1993 Gunson served as head coach of New Zealand. During her three years as head coach she guided New Zealand to 45 wins in 49 tests. In her debut year as coach she guided New Zealand to eight wins out of eight. This included New Zealand winning the 1989 World Games title and defeating Australia 3–0 in a home series of matches. She was subsequently named New Zealand Coach of the Year for 1989 while the New Zealand national netball team where named Team of the Year. She also served as head coach of New Zealand at the 1991 World Netball Championships. Her last tournament as head coach was the 1993 World Games.

Waikato Bay of Plenty Magic
Between 1999 and 2000 Gunson coached Waikato Bay of Plenty Magic in New Zealand's Coco-Cola Cup.

Team Bath
Between 1999 and 2008 Gunson served as head coach and/or director of netball for Team Bath. She initially arrived at the University of Bath to study for a doctorate. During the Super Cup era, she guided Team Bath to the 2004 title. As director of netball she subsequently oversaw Team Bath as they won the inaugural Netball Superleague title in 2005–06 and then retain it in 2006–07. During her time with Team Bath she helped mentor the next generation of English netball coaches, including Tamsin Greenway and Jess Thirlby. In 2015 Gunson was inducted into the University of Bath/Team Bath Hall of Fame for Sport. In 2019 Team Bath renamed the trophy awarded to the winners of their pre-season tournament after Gunson. Saracens Mavericks subsequently won the inaugural Lyn Gunson Trophy.

England
Between 2002 and 2003 Gunson served as head coach of England. She had previously served as an assistant coach. She was the England head coach at both the 2002 Commonwealth Games and 2003 World Netball Championships.

Later years
In 2008 Gunson returned to New Zealand where she remained involved with netball. Between 2008 and 2011 she served as  director of netball for Netball North Harbour. She later worked as a Coaching Consultant at the New Zealand Academy of Sport North Island.

Honours

Player
New Zealand
World Netball Championships
Shared: 1979
Runners Up: 1983
World Games
Winners: 1985

Head coach
New Zealand
World Games
Winners: 1989 
Runners Up: 1993
New Zealand Team of the Year
Winners: 1989 
World Netball Championships
Runners Up: 1991
Individual
New Zealand Coach of the Year
Winner: 1989 
Team Bath
Netball Superleague
Winners: 2005–06, 2006–07
Super Cup
Winners: 2004

References

Living people
1953 births
New Zealand international netball players
New Zealand national netball team coaches
New Zealand netball players
New Zealand netball coaches
Netball players at the 1985 World Games
England national netball team coaches
Team Bath (netball) coaches
Waikato Bay of Plenty Magic coaches
Netball Superleague coaches
New Zealand expatriate netball people in England
University of Otago alumni
University of Waikato alumni
Academic staff of the University of Waikato
Alumni of the University of Bath
New Zealand schoolteachers
1975 World Netball Championships players
1979 World Netball Championships players
1983 World Netball Championships players
National Bank Cup coaches